Cryptolechia chrysocoma is a moth in the family Depressariidae. It was described by Edward Meyrick in 1905. It is found in Sri Lanka.

The wingspan is about 16 mm. The forewings are dark shining purplish-bronzy-fuscous. The costal edge is yellow except at the base and apex. The hindwings are dark bronzy-fuscous.

References

Moths described in 1905
Cryptolechia (moth)
Taxa named by Edward Meyrick